The Thai Super Cup was a football cup competition among top football clubs in Thailand. It was initially launched in December 2009, featuring the top four teams of the 2009 Thai Premier League season. However, only one edition - taking place in 2009 - occurred.

Winners

All Time Winners 

3